Krushchev in Iowa Trail is a planned rail trail running  from Herndon, Iowa, to Coon Rapids, Iowa. It is a planned part of the American Discovery Trail.

Originally known as the Corn Diplomacy Trail, the Krushchev in Iowa Trail is to be a paved recreational trail that runs through the counties of Guthrie and Carroll along an abandoned Burlington Northern Santa Fe rail line.

Trailheads

Planned trailheads

Herndon
Bagley
Bayard
Coon Rapids

Connections to other recreational trails

A connection is planned at Herndon to the  Raccoon River Valley Trail in Guthrie county.  A connection is planned to Carroll, which is a terminus of the  Sauk Rail Trail in Carroll and Sac counties.  A third connection is planned between Coon Rapids and Audubon, which is a terminus of the  T-Bone Trail in Audubon and Cass counties.

Lemonade Ride
The annual  Lemonade Ride is held between Panora and Coon Rapids along portion of the Raccoon River Valley Trail and the Krushchev in Iowa Trail.

See also
List of rail trails

References

External links
Krushchev in Iowa Trail

Rail trails in Iowa
Protected areas of Guthrie County, Iowa
Protected areas of Carroll County, Iowa